Beach volleyball, for the 2013 Pacific Mini Games, was held at Kolopelu's Place on Futuna. The competition schedule for this sport went from 5 to 10 September 2013.

Medal table

Results

Men

Round Robin

Pool A

|}

Pool B

|}

Pool C

|}

Knockout stage

Women

Round Robin

Pool A

|}

Pool B

|}

Pool C

|}

Knockout stage

References

Beach volleyball at the Pacific Games
2013 Pacific Mini Games
Pacific Mini Games